Pommiers-en-Forez (literally Pommiers in Forez; before 2020: Pommiers) is a commune in the Loire department in central France.

Population

See also
Communes of the Loire department

References

Pommiersenforez